Atticus: ...Dragging the Lake was the first in the series of compilation albums created by  Atticus Clothing. The bands were chosen by Mark Hoppus and Tom Delonge from Blink-182.

Track listing
"Jaked On Green Beers" - Alkaline Trio †
"Post Script" - Finch
"Time To Break Up" - Blink-182 †
"Ex-Miss" - New Found Glory †
"Walking On Glass" - The Movielife
"Long Way To Fall" - Autopilot Off †
"Yakisoba" - Avoid One Thing
"Find Comfort In Yourself" - Midtown
"On Vacations" - Rival Schools †
"Tiny Voices" - Box Car Racer †
"Bright Lights, Big City" - Madcap †
"AM/PM" - American Nightmare
"Daddy's Little Defect" - Sugarcult
"Radio Cambodia" - Glassjaw †
"Sugar Free" - The Mighty Mighty Bosstones †
"Catherine Morgan" - Bad Astronaut (Feat. members of Lagwagon)
"Greg's Last Day" - The Starting Line
"I'd Do Anything" - Simple Plan (Feat. guest vocal from Mark Hoppus)
"The Safety Of Routine" - Name Taken †
"A Box Full Of Sharp Objects" - The Used †
"I Believe" - Agent 51
"Friday Nite" - Slick Shoes
"Destination" - Kut U Up †
"Praise Chorus" (Live in London) - Jimmy Eat World †

† : These tracks are marked on the original artwork as 'Unreleased'.

References

2002 compilation albums